Meglid Mihani (born 1 September 1983) is a retired Albanian professional footballer who played as a midfielder.

Club career

Early career
Mihani begun his career with his boyhood club Besa Kavajë where he played for 6 years, recording more than 100 appearances before switching for Lushnja.

Teuta Durrës
In July 2015, Migani signed with Teuta Durrës, returning in top flight after one season. He made his debut for the club on 22 August in the opening match of 2015–16 Albanian Superliga, netting the winner at Flamurtari Vlorë for the first three points of the season. He dedicated the goal to coach Gugash Magani after the match. Magani asked the club for his release on 19 January 2016 in order to join Pogradeci; his request was granted.

Pogradeci
On 19 January 2016, Mihani agreed personal terms and joined Pogradeci in second tier; he signed a contract until the end of the season and was presented on the same day.

Korabi Peshkopi
In July 2016, Mihani joined newly promoted top flight side Korabi Peshkopi.

Tomori Berat
In September 2016, Mihani completed a transfer to fellow second tier Tomori Berat by penning a contract running until June 2017.

Besa Kavajë
On 15 August 2017, Migani signed a contract and returned to his first club Besa Kavajë after four years. Despite a mass exodus at the club during the winter transfer window, Mihani was one of the few players to be confirmed for the second part of the season.

Honours
Besa Kavajë
 Albanian Cup: 2009–10
 Albanian Supercup: 2010

References

External links
AFA profile

1983 births
Living people
Footballers from Kavajë
Albanian footballers
Association football midfielders
Besa Kavajë players
KS Lushnja players
KF Adriatiku Mamurrasi players
KF Teuta Durrës players
KS Pogradeci players
KF Korabi Peshkopi players
FK Tomori Berat players
Kategoria Superiore players
Kategoria e Parë players